Calliotropis crustulum is a species of sea snail, a marine gastropod mollusk in the family Calliostomatidae. This species occurs off Chile.

References

External links

crustulum
Gastropods described in 2006
Endemic fauna of Chile